Estádio Doutor Jorge Ismael de Biasi, sometimes known as Jorjão, is a multi-use stadium in Novo Horizonte, São Paulo, Brazil. It is used mostly for football matches, and has a maximum capacity of 14,096 people.

Inaugurated on 22 March 1987 in a match between Novorizontino and Internacional de Limeira, the stadium was named after Jorge Ismael de Biasi, the man that build the stadium with his own resources. In March 2020, the club inaugurated a new facade and honoured Dr. de Biasi with a statue.

References

External links
Grêmio Novorizontino profile 
Templos do Futebol profile 

Football venues in São Paulo (state)
Grêmio Esportivo Novorizontino
Grêmio Novorizontino
Sports venues in São Paulo (state)